The 2007 Radio Disney Music Awards were held on December 22, 2007, at the Radio Disney, Burbank, California. After this edition the awards started a hiatus of four years after the 2008 awards.

Production
At that time the Radio Disney Music Awards wasn't an official ceremony but just a special edition on the Radio Disney broadcast and held on December 22, 2007. The Radio Disney Music Awards contained 15 categories, with 4 nominees for votes in 4 weeks.

Nominees and winners
List of categories and winners in 2007.

Best Female Artist
Hilary Duff
Avril Lavigne
Miley Cyrus
Kelly Clarkson

Best Male Artist
Jesse McCartney
Corbin Bleu
Justin Timberlake
Zac Efron

Best Group
Jonas Brothers
Aly & AJ
Everlife
The Cheetah Girls

Best New Artist
Ashley Tisdale
Drake Bell
Jonas Brothers
Miranda Cosgrove

Best Song
"With Love" – Hilary Duff
"Girlfriend" – Avril Lavigne
"See You Again" – Miley Cyrus
"He Said She Said" – Ashley Tisdale

Best Artist Turned Singer
Amanda Bynes
Ashley Tisdale
Drake Bell
Miranda Cosgrove

Best Top 40 Artist
Hilary Duff
Avril Lavigne
Kelly Clarkson
Vanessa Hudgens

Best Team Anthem
"Fabulous" – Ashley Tisdale and Lucas Grabeel
"Makes Me Happy" – Drake Bell
"SOS" – Jonas Brothers
"You Are the Music in Me" – Vanessa Hudgens, Zac Efron and Olesya Rulin

Best Video That Rocks
"Stranger" – Hilary Duff
"Girlfriend" – Avril Lavigne
"He Said She Said" – Ashley Tisdale
"Say OK" – Vanessa Hudgens

Best Soundtrack Song
"Gotta Go My Own Way" – Vanessa Hudgens and Zac Efron
"Push It to the Limit" – Corbin Bleu
"What Time Is It?" – High School Musical 2 cast
"Without Love" – Amanda Bynes

Best Song to Dance
"Girlfriend" – Avril Lavigne
"He Said She Said" – Ashley Tisdale
"Never Again" – Kelly Clarkson
"With Love" – Hilary Duff

Best Song to Wake Up To
"Leave It All to Me" – Miranda Cosgrove
"Never Again" – Kelly Clarkson
"Outta My Head (Ay Ya Ya)" – Ashlee Simpson
"What Time Is It?" – High School Musical 2 cast

Best song to Sing to an Ex
"With Love" – Hilary Duff
"Girlfriend" – Avril Lavigne
"Never Again" – Kelly Clarkson
"Potential Breakup Song" – Aly & AJ

Most Stylish Singer
Amanda Bynes
Ashley Tisdale
Miley Cyrus
Vanessa Hudgens

Most Talked About Artist
Amanda Bynes
Ashley Tisdale
Avril Lavigne
Gwen Stefani

References

External links
Official website

Radio Disney Music Awards
Radio Disney Music Awards
Radio Disney Music Awards
Radio Disney Music Awards
2007 awards in the United States